Cross-country skiing at the 2017 Winter Universiade was held in Alatau Cross-Country Skiing & Biathlon Complex from January 30 to February 8, 2017.

Men's events

Women's events

Mixed events

External links
Cross-country skiing at the 2017 Winter Universiade.
Results book

 
Cross-country skiing
2017
Winter Universiade